The Celtic Cup is an international wheelchair rugby league tournament contested annually by Scotland, Ireland and Wales. It was first held as a two-match series between Scotland and Ireland in 2015 which was won by Ireland. Wales joined in 2016 to create a three-team round-robin tournament and have won the cup six times between 2016 and 2022.

History
The Ireland, Scotland and Wales teams were all established in 2012 and played their first international matches at the Four Nations competition that year before taking part in the World Cup in 2013. The Celtic Cup was established to provide an opportunity for international matches beyond these tournaments, initially between Ireland and Scotland in 2015, and with Wales in 2016.

The first leg of the inaugural Celtic Cup was played on 18 April 2015 at the Dundee International Sports Centre, Dundee. It was the first international wheelchair rugby league match to be played in Scotland. Ireland took an early 28-point lead and went on to win the match 52–28. The second leg took place on 24 May at the Blackpool Sports Centre, Blackpool, on the same weekend as the rugby league Summer Bash. Logistically this made sense for Ireland whose captain, Damian McCabe, noted that the sport was "not being played in Ireland at the moment" and that most of the squad lived in northern England. This time Ireland took a 68–10 lead at half-time eventually winning the match 80–48 to win the series with an aggregate score of 132–76.

Ireland hosted the second Celtic Cup on 30 April 2016, which was again played at the Blackpool Sports Centre. In 2016 it became a three-team competition when Wales were invited to take part. The match between Ireland and Scotland ended as a draw with both sides scoring 58 points. Wales won both of their matches defeating Ireland 76–26 and Scotland 92–22 to win the cup for the first time.

Wales retained their title on 29 April 2017 when the tournament was held at The Peak, Stirling. Hosts Scotland lost their opening fixture 16–26 against Ireland and were kept scoreless by Wales who defeated them 72–0 having already beaten Ireland by a score of 51–6 earlier in the day.

The 2018 Celtic Cup was held on 28 April at the Deeside Leisure Centre, Queensferry. Wales, who were hosting an international wheelchair rugby league tournament for the first time, began their title defence with a 112–41 win over Scotland. Ireland also defeated Scotland 68–36, but then lost 84–30 to Wales who claimed a third Celtic Cup title.

The 2019 Celtic Cup took place on 27 April at Calderdale College, Halifax. Wales dominated the tournament scoring centuries in each of their games, firstly against Scotland 102-10 and then Ireland 109–8, to take a fourth consecutive title. In the final game Scotland came back from 18–38 at half-time to defeat Ireland 52–42. It was the first win for Scotland in any international since 24 September 2015 when they had beaten both Ireland and Wales in the European Championships.

The Celtic Cup was postponed in 2020 due to the COVID-19 pandemic. It resumed in 2021 and was held on 12 June at the Oriam Performance Centre at Heriot-Watt University, Edinburgh, as the originally proposed venue, The Pleasance sports complex at the University of Edinburgh, was being used as a COVID-19 testing centre. The hosts lost 32–52 to Ireland in the opening game. Ireland then faced Wales who defeated them 96-16 and in a repeat of the 2019 tournament Wales scored a century against Scotland to win 102-18 and maintain their unbeaten record in the Celtic Cup.

On 7 May 2022 the Celtic Cup was held at the Plas Madoc Leisure Centre, Wrexham. Hosts and defending champions Wales defeated Ireland 64–22 in the opening fixture. The second game was close with Ireland taking the victory 38–35 over Scotland. In the final match Wales won 116–6 setting a new record for their biggest win and claiming a sixth Celtic Cup.

Results

Tables

References

External links
Celtic Cup - Scotland Rugby League

European rugby league competitions
Recurring sporting events established in 2015
Wheelchair rugby league